Jonathan Fernando Suárez Freitez (born 8 December 1982, in San Félix, Bolívar) is a Venezuelan professional BMX cyclist. Dubbed by his sporting fans as El Mosquito, Suarez has been highly considered a solid, all-around BMX rider in Latin America, and more importantly, one of the world's top cruisers in the sport. He won two men's cruiser medals, including his gold, at the UCI BMX World Championships, and later represented his nation Venezuela at the 2008 Summer Olympics.

Suarez sought headlines on the international scene by edging out Filipino-American rider Daniel Caluag, who previously represented the United States, for a prestigious gold medal in men's cruiser at the 2007 UCI BMX World Championships in Victoria, British Columbia, Canada. He also collected a silver medal to his career hardware in men's BMX cycling at the Pan American Games in Rio de Janeiro on that same year, trailing behind 33-year-old U.S. rider Jason Richardson by less than a second.

Suarez qualified for the Venezuelan squad, as the nation's sole rider, in men's BMX cycling at the 2008 Summer Olympics in Beijing by receiving an automatic berth from the Union Cycliste Internationale based on his top-ten performance from the BMX World Rankings. Suarez started his morning session by grabbing the eighth prelims seed in 36.325 seconds, but he could not match a more stellar ride in his quarterfinal heat with 17 positioning points and a fifth-place finish, narrowly missing out the semifinals by a six-point deficit.

References

External links
 
 
 
 
 

1982 births
Living people
Venezuelan male cyclists
BMX riders
Olympic cyclists of Venezuela
Cyclists at the 2008 Summer Olympics
Pan American Games silver medalists for Venezuela
Pan American Games medalists in cycling
Cyclists at the 2007 Pan American Games
Cyclists at the 2011 Pan American Games
Medalists at the 2007 Pan American Games
UCI BMX World Champions (elite men)
People from Bolívar (state)
20th-century Venezuelan people
21st-century Venezuelan people
Competitors at the 2010 Central American and Caribbean Games